Gömürdəhnə (also, Gümür Dəhnə, Dəhnə, Gömür-Dəhnə; Tat: Gümür Dəhnə) is a village and municipality in the Quba Rayon of Azerbaijan.  It has a population of 227.  The municipality consists of the villages of Gömürdəhnə and Puçuq.

References

External links

Populated places in Quba District (Azerbaijan)